The Ayu Islands (Kepulauan Ayu), are a small archipelago south of the Asia Islands and north of Raja Ampat Islands in Indonesia. This group is formed by two coral atolls. The highest point is 106 m.

In older maps these islands appear as the Ajoe Islands, following the Dutch spelling "Ajoe-eilanden".

The beaches of these islands are a breeding ground for the leatherback turtle (Dermochelys coriacea). The waters off the Ayu Islands are a good snorkeling and scuba diving site.

Administratively the Ayu Islands belong to the Indonesian province of Southwest Papua.

References

Atolls of the Pacific Ocean
Archipelagoes of Indonesia
Islands of Western New Guinea
Landforms of Southwest Papua 
Raja Ampat Islands
Uninhabited islands of Indonesia